Caustis is a genus of rhizomatous sedges. The species, all endemic to Australia, are as follows:

Caustis blakei Kuk.
Caustis deserti R.L.Barrett
Caustis dioica R.Br.
Caustis flexuosa R.Br. - Curly Wig
Caustis gigas R.L.Barrett
Caustis pentandra  R.Br. -Thick Twist Rush
Caustis recurvata  Spreng.
Caustis restiacea  Benth.

References

 
Cyperaceae genera
Taxa named by Robert Brown (botanist, born 1773)